Gillan was an English rock and metal band formed in 1978 by Deep Purple vocalist Ian Gillan. Gillan was one of the hard rock bands to make a significant impact and commercial success in the United Kingdom during the early 1980s, with five silver albums. They sold over 10 million LPs worldwide.

History

1978: The Ian Gillan new band
In July 1978 Ian Gillan had become dissatisfied with the jazz fusion style of his band Ian Gillan Band and dissolved it, retaining only keyboard player Colin Towns, and formed this new band entitled Gillan. He added Steve Byrd on guitar, Liam Genockey on drums and John McCoy on bass, and initially pursued a progressive rock direction, releasing their eponymous debut in September 1978, although they could get a record deal only in Japan, Australia and New Zealand. This recording has subsequently become more widely available as The Japanese Album as a CD re-issue by RPM Records in 1994. However, the RPM CD issue replaces the original opening instrumental "Second Sight" with another instrumental, "Street Theatre". Genocky was unable to commit to the band beyond the recording of the album and the band's live debut at the Reading Festival in 1978. He was replaced for the subsequent tour by Pete Barnacle.

At Christmas 1978, Ian Gillan turned down an offer from Ritchie Blackmore to join Rainbow, but Blackmore did make a guest appearance for Gillan at their Christmas show. It was the first time Ian Gillan and Blackmore had performed together since 1973.

1979–1981: The glory era
The album was sufficiently successful to attract more attention and in 1979 the band secured a European deal with Acrobat Records. Before a new album was recorded, Byrd was replaced by Bernie Tormé and Barnacle by drummer Mick Underwood, Ian Gillan's former colleague in Episode Six. Torme's "screaming guitar" sound fundamentally altered the dynamics and Gillan took a more heavy metal direction. This line-up's first album was released as Mr. Universe and contained many re-worked songs from The Japanese Album. The album went straight into the UK album charts but stalled as Acrobat Records went bankrupt. This led to a multi-album deal with Virgin Records.

Meanwhile, in Japan, Australia and New Zealand a version of Mr. Universe was released with a different track selection to avoid repeating the Gillan tracks used on the Mr. Universe album. Several of the alternative tracks are included on the Japanese Album release.

The band caught the rise of the NWOBHM at just the right time and the group gained popularity in Europe.

In 1980 Gillan reached the peak of their success, releasing the album Glory Road, with initial copies containing the free album For Gillan Fans Only. However, the band remained unknown in North America and were unable to raise any interest there despite a long and difficult 1980 US tour.

By 1981 the band members had become disgruntled that their European and Japanese success was not translating into increased financial rewards, and after the Future Shock album, whilst on tour in Germany, Torme left just before the band were due to fly back to the UK to appear on Top of the Pops.

1982: Struggles and final shows
Tormé was replaced by White Spirit guitarist Janick Gers (who would later join Iron Maiden) and this line-up released the live/studio double album Double Trouble at the end of 1981. In August 1982, the final album Magic followed. By this time, tension over money had reached fever pitch and Ian Gillan needed time to have surgery as a result of damage to his vocal cords. After the Magic tour, the band performed a final show at the Wembley Arena on 17 December, and then Ian Gillan dissolved the group while he underwent surgery. He then accepted an offer to front Black Sabbath to the incredulity of the Gillan band members, particularly McCoy, and the acrimony remains to the present day.

McCoy subsequently released compilations of studio out-takes to which he had the rights, known as The Gillan Tapes. Bernie Tormé and John McCoy collaborated on the GMT band project, releasing two albums in 2006 and 2009.

Band members
Ian Gillan – vocals (1978–1982)
John McCoy – bass (1978–1982)
Colin Towns – keyboards (1978–1982)
Steve Byrd – guitar (1978–1979)
Liam Genockey – drums (1978)
Pete Barnacle – drums (1978–1979)
Mick Underwood – drums (1979–1982)
Bernie Tormé – guitar (1979–1981)
Janick Gers – guitar (1981–1982)

Ian Gillan Band/Gillan timeline

Discography

Studio albums

 All Gillan albums recorded between 1979 and 1982 (excluding The Japanese Album) have been re-released as remastered editions with bonus tracks in 2007

Live albums
 Live at Reading '80 (1990), Raw Fruit
 The BBC Tapes Vol 1: Dead of Night 1979 (1998), RPM
 The BBC Tapes Vol 2: Unchain Your Brain 1980 (1998), RPM
 Live At The BBC - 79/80 (1999), Angel Air
 Live Tokyo Shinjuku Koseinenkin Hall (2001), Angel Air
 On The Rocks Live in Germany, June 1981 (2002), Angel Air
 Live Wembley 17 December 1982 (2002), Angel Air
 Mutually Assured Destruction Glasgow 1982 (2006), Angel Air
 Live At The Marquee 1978 (2008), Angel Air
 No Easy Way CD:Live Hammersmith 1980, DVD:Live Edinburgh 1980 (2008), Angel Air
 Triple Trouble (2009) (Recorded live 1981/1982), Edsel

Compilation albums
 The Gillan Tapes Vol. 1 (1997), Angel Air
 The Gillan Tapes Vol. 2 (1999), Angel Air
 The Gillan Tapes Vol. 3 (2000), Angel Air
 Unchain Your Brain: The Best Of Gillan (2007), Music Club
 The Gillan Singles Box Set (2007), Edsel
 The Vinyl Collection 1979-1982 (2016)

DVDs
 Live Edinburgh 1980 (2006), Angel Air
 The Glory Years (2008) (Recorded live 1981), Eagle Rock

Singles

References

External links
 Music Might biography

Ian Gillan
English hard rock musical groups
Musical groups established in 1978
Musical groups disestablished in 1980
Musical groups reestablished in 1981
Musical groups disestablished in 1983
English heavy metal musical groups
Musical quintets
Virgin Records artists
RSO Records artists
New Wave of British Heavy Metal musical groups